BBC Radio Surrey is the BBC's local radio station serving Surrey, north-east Hampshire and north West Sussex (including Gatwick Airport). It broadcasts on FM, DAB, digital TV and via BBC Sounds from studios at the University of Surrey in Guildford.

Overview 
BBC Radio Surrey broadcasts breakfast programming for Surrey and North-East Hampshire six days a week, alongside hourly local news bulletins throughout the day.

BBC Radio Surrey is transmitted on 104 and 104.6 FM, and on DAB via the MuxCo Surrey multiplex, which officially launched on 12 December 2013. It has also been available on BBC iPlayer since 2 September 2009.

In addition, BBC Radio Surrey also broadcasts on Freeview TV channel 722 in the BBC South East region and streams online via BBC Sounds.

According to RAJAR, BBC Radio Surrey and BBC Radio Sussex share a combined weekly audience of 210,000 listeners and a 2.3% share as of December 2022.

Programming 
Local programming airs from the BBC's Guildford studios from 6am to 10am on Mondays to Saturdays and from 2-6pm on Saturdays.

Regional programming, shared with BBC Radio Sussex, airs from 10am - 10pm on weekdays, from 10am - 2pm and 8-10pm on Saturdays and from 6am - 6pm and 10pm - 1am on Sundays.

Off-peak programming, including the weekday late show from 10pm - 1am, originates from BBC Radio Solent in Southampton and BBC Radio Berkshire in Reading.

During the station's downtime, BBC Radio Surrey simulcasts overnight programming from BBC Radio 5 Live and BBC Radio London.

Frequencies 

Analogue VHF FM
104.0 MHz - Redhill, Reigate & Crawley (Reigate Transmitter)
104.6 MHz - Guildford (Guildford Transmitter)
Analogue Mediumwave AM
1368 kHz - Reigate & Crawley (Duxhurst Transmitter) [Ceased 03/01/2018]
DAB Digital Radio: Block 10C 213.36 MHz
Reigate & Crawley (Reigate Transmitter)
Guildford (Guildford Transmitter)
South West London (Crystal Palace Transmitter)
Farnham (Hungry Hill Transmitter)
Leatherhead (Stoke d'Abernon Transmitter)

History

BBC Radio Surrey (1991–1994)
In the late 1980s, with the BBC Local Radio network nearing completion, a management team was appointed for 'BBC Radio Surrey and Berkshire', the plan being to have two separate stations with their own identities, but with shared resources, and some shared programming. But then in 1990, as part of a plan to save £3 million, the BBC announced that BBC Radio Surrey would instead launch as an opt-out service of BBC Radio Sussex, with BBC Radio Berkshire an opt-out of BBC Radio Oxford.

BBC Radio Surrey went on air initially on Saturday 6 September 1991 for coverage of a cricket match between Surrey and Hampshire - this was simply a relay of Radio Solent's coverage. The station finally went on air officially at 6.00am on Thursday 14 November 1991.  At launch it broadcast 43 hours a week of its own programming from its studios on the campus of the University of Surrey in Guildford.  The remainder of the output came from either its sister station BBC Radio Sussex, or from the BBC South & East network.

Just over a week after launch BBC Radio Surrey presented its first Children in Need programme, and breakfast presenter John Terrett and travel reporter Christina King made a brief appearance on the South East section of the television coverage.  However the station was to receive little more in the way of promotion thereafter.

Over its two years on air BBC Radio Surrey struggled to build a substantial audience; in fact audience figures reached a maximum of only 29,000, or 7 per cent reach, in 1993.  One factor in this was that the output was broadcast by only one transmitter at Guildford, covering West Surrey on 104.6 FM, meaning listeners in East Surrey could not hear the station properly (Although at the time of establishing the station, there was the possibility of it getting the 1350AM frequency to also broadcast on). Another was the fact that the county's ILR stations were already long-established, making it difficult for the new station to establish itself.

John Terrett hosted the breakfast show from launch, which featured regular reports from the station's own dedicated travel presenter Christina King. It was followed by Julian Clegg's mid-morning phone-in, which was simulcast with BBC Radio Sussex - although news and travel bulletins were split between the two stations every hour throughout the day. The joint output avoided mentioning the name of either station; instead full use was made of split jingles. At midday Steve Watts hosted the hour-long 'Watts for Lunch' which featured celebrity guests, local topics, and the Weather Wardens, made up of listener-correspondents from across the county, who brought unusual facts and history about their corner of Surrey.  Following Miranda Birch's consumer show from Brighton, the final daily programme from Guildford was Drivetime with Claire Paul, although since she was also station editor she was absent from the show more often than not. Charles Carroll, Mike Carson and Radio Sussex's Stewart Macintosh were the usual stand-ins. In the early days Christina King presented travel reports during this show as well.

There were three weekend programmes from Guildford - Steve Watts's light-hearted Saturday show which included a pub team quiz; the religious programme Sunday Best; and Nick Simmons's laid back Sunday morning show of music and chat.

In October 1992, John Terrett and Claire Paul left, so Stewart Macintosh took over the lunchtime show (while continuing to present BBC Radio Sussex's breakfast show) and Tim Humphrey moved to breakfast, while Steve Watts moved to Drivetime. Jonathan Wills, later a presenter on ITV's London Tonight, joined the station, first as a travel presenter, before moving on to news reading and then sports presenting. During 1993 Phil Kennedy became a regular stand-in on BBC Radio Surrey's Drivetime and lunchtime shows.

Following schedule changes in July 1993, BBC Radio Surrey was gradually wound down. From September the station was identified on air as 'BBC Radio Sussex and Surrey', although some programmes remained split between the two counties. The merger was complete on 7 January 1994 when BBC Radio Sussex and Surrey officially became a single station.

BBC Southern Counties Radio (1994–2009)

On 1 August 1994 the station's name was changed to BBC Southern Counties Radio.  At first it ran a single all-talk schedule across Sussex and Surrey, however in September 1997 a dedicated breakfast show for Surrey was reintroduced, followed by a drivetime show in April 2006.  Apart from a brief period in 2006, the former BBC Radio Sussex transmitter at Reigate on 104.0 FM was now used for the Surrey output, in order to give better reception for listeners in East Surrey.

BBC Surrey (2009–2020)
The county name returned to the radio station's name on 30 March 2009, when BBC Surrey became the new name for BBC Southern Counties Radio across Surrey, North-East Hampshire and Crawley, broadcasting on 104.0 and 104.6 FM.  Mark Carter was the first voice on air, presenting Breakfast 6-9am.

BBC Radio Surrey (2020–present)
On 30 March 2020 the station reverted to its original name of BBC Radio Surrey.

References

External links 
BBC Radio Surrey
Media UK - BBC Radio Surrey

Surrey
Radio stations in Surrey
Radio stations established in 1991
1991 establishments in England